Dorian Leljak is a Serbian pianist holding professorship at the Academy of Arts in Novi Sad, where he was trained under Arbo Valdma, and the presidency of the European Piano Teachers Association's Vojvodina branch. Leljak will serve as a juror at the XVIII Cleveland International Piano Competition.

References
  Cleveland International Piano Competition

Serbian classical pianists
Living people
21st-century classical pianists
Year of birth missing (living people)
Place of birth missing (living people)